"Paint My Love" is a song by Danish soft rock band Michael Learns to Rock. It was released as the first single from their 1997 album Nothing to Lose. It was first released in 1996 from their Greatest Hits album Paint My Love (only in Asia) but later released as a promotional single in 1997 from their fourth album Nothing to Lose.

A Tagalog version of the song titled as "Sa'yo Lang" ("Yours Only"), a direct translation of "Kun med dig", was performed by Renz Verano.

Chart performance
The song is one of the band's most successful songs, reaching #4 in Denmark and #27 in Switzerland and it was also a hit in Asia.

Track listing
MLTR Greatest Hits - album CD-maxi'''

See also
 Danish pop

References

External links

1996 songs
1997 singles
EMI Records singles
Michael Learns to Rock songs
Songs written by Jascha Richter